Albert Edward Mead (December 14, 1861 – March 19, 1913) was an American lawyer and politician who served as the fifth governor of Washington from 1905 to 1909.

Biography
Mead was born in Kansas on December 14, 1861.  There is conflicting information about his town of birth: most reliable sources say it was Manhattan, Kansas, but there is one claim he was born in Ashland, Kansas.  He received his formal education at Southern Illinois Normal University and at Northwestern University's Union College of Law in Chicago.

Career
After graduating from law school in 1885, Mead returned to Kansas to practice law for four years. He married Elizabeth "Lizzy" Pauline Brown and they had one daughter, Mary; and three sons, Wendell, Roland, and William.  In 1889, he moved to Washington Territory. Mead served as Mayor of Blaine, Washington (1892), as a member of the Washington State House of Representatives (1892), and as prosecuting attorney for Whatcom County, Washington from 1898 to 1903. His wife, "Lizzy", died in 1898, and on May 5, 1899, he married Mina Jane Hosmer Pifer, and they had one son, Albert Vincent.

Mead's election to the governor's office in 1904 over U.S. Senator George Turner was considered a significant upset at the time. During his tenure, he supported legislation establishing a Railroad Commission, and acts establishing a State Bank Examiner, a State Tax Commission, and a State Highway Commission.

After his term as governor ended, Mead moved to Bellingham, Washington, where he returned to private practice as a lawyer and served as president of the Chamber of Commerce.

Death
Mead died in Bellingham on March 19, 1913, and is interred at Bayview Cemetery.

References

Further reading
 Meany, Edmond S. Governors of Washington: Territorial and State. University of Washington (1915). Originally published as a series of brief biographical articles in the weekday issues of the Post-Intelligencer from September 27 to October 22, 1915.

External links
National Governors Association

Washington Secretary of State.
 Photo of his wife in 1905

Mead, Albert E.
1861 births
1913 deaths
Politicians from Manhattan, Kansas
People from Bellingham, Washington
Northwestern University Pritzker School of Law alumni
Southern Illinois University Carbondale alumni
Republican Party governors of Washington (state)
19th-century American politicians
Mayors of places in Washington (state)
People from Blaine, Washington
Republican Party members of the Washington House of Representatives